Abuakwa State College is a co-ed second cycle institution in Kibi in Eastern Region of Ghana.

History
The school was established in 1936 by three elders of the Methodist Church at Asafo-Akyem as a preparatory institution to prepare Ghanaian students who wanted to sit the then Junior Cambridge Examination. It was relocated to Kyebi in 1937 by Nana Sir Ofori Atta I who laid the foundation stone on 11th October, 1937 thus becoming the founder and father of the school, Abuakwa State College was born to enable more students especially those from Akyem Abuakwa to enroll in the school.

Headmasters

Notable Persons Associated with Abuakwa State College

Notable alumni
 Gibson Dokyi Ampaw- minister in the second republic
 Rose Akua Ampofo- First Ghanaian woman to be ordained as a Presbyterian Minister 
 Akenten Appiah-Menka- politician and businessman
 Kwesi Amoako Atta - current roads & highways minister
 John Odaate-Barnor-former Chief of Defense Staff
 Asare Konadu- Writer
 Jacob Kwakye-Maafo- physician
 Mzbel- Ghanaian musician
 Bob Pixel - Photographer
 Boahene Yeboah-Afari - minister of state in the Nkrumah government 
 Carlos Kingsley Ahenkorah, politician
 Rev. Rose Akua Ampofo
 Hon. Ahmed Arthur, former member of parliament for okaikwei South Constituency

Notable staff 
Ken Attafuah
Kojo Botsio
Ebenezer Moses Debrah
Samuel Odoi-Sykes  
Kofi Asante Ofori-Atta
William Ofori-Atta

References

Educational institutions established in 1936
Public schools in Ghana
1936 establishments in Gold Coast (British colony)
High schools in Ghana
Education in the Eastern Region (Ghana)
Schools in Ghana